Fighter Squadron 8 or VF-8 was an aviation unit of the U.S. Navy, originally established on 1 June 1943, it was disestablished on 23 November 1945. It was the second US Navy squadron to be designated VF-8.

Operational history

VF-8 under the command of Lt Cdr William M. Collins Jr. was initially assigned to the  during that ship's shakedown cruise in the Caribbean. 

In March 1944 the squadron was deployed as part of Carrier Air Group 8 (CVG-8) aboard the  until October 1944. During this deployment VF-8 pilot Lt. Edward L. Feightner scored 5 victories, bringing his total score to 9.

From November 1944 to the end of January 1945 CVG-8 was shore-based at NAS Alameda. From February to mid-May CVG-8 was based at NAAS Watsonville. From late May to early August 1945 CVG-8 was based at NAS Puunene Hawaii. By September 1945 CVG-8 was based on Saipan.

Home port assignments
The squadron was assigned to these home ports:
Naval Auxiliary Air Station Pungo
NAS Alameda
NAS Puunene

Aircraft assignment
F6F-3/5 Hellcat

See also
 List of inactive United States Navy aircraft squadrons
 History of the United States Navy

References

External links

Aircraft squadrons of the United States Navy